Sebastia (Sabastiyah; , Sevasti; , Sebastiya) is a Palestinian village of over 4,500 inhabitants, located in the Nablus Governorate of the State of Palestine, some 12 kilometers northwest of the city of Nablus.

Sebastia is believed to be one of the oldest continuously inhabited places in the West Bank. In the 9th century BCE, it was known as Samaria, and served as the capital city of the northern Kingdom of Israel until it was destroyed by the Neo-Assyrian Empire around 720 BCE. It became an administrative center under Assyrian, Babylonian and Persian rule. During the early Roman period, the city was expanded and fortified by Herod the Great, who renamed it Sebastia in honor of emperor Augustus. Since the middle of the 4th century, the town has been identified by Christians and Muslims as the burial site of John the Baptist, whose purported grave is today part of Nabi Yahya Mosque. Conquered by Muslims in the 7th century, the present-day village of Sebastia is home to a number of important archaeological sites.<ref>For excavations conducted during the Ottoman period, see {{cite book |last1=Reisner |first1=G.A. |title=Harvard Excavations at Samaria, 1908–1910 |last2=Fisher |first2=C.S. |last3=Lyon |first3=D.G. |publisher=Harvard University Press |year=1924 |edition=2 vols. |location=Cambridge, Massachusetts}}. See also: The Augusteum at Samaria-Sebaste</ref>

 Etymology 
In ancient times, Sebastia was known as Samaria which translates into "watch" or "watchman" in English. The city of Samaria later gave its name to the region of Samaria, the ancient Hebrew name used for the central region of the Land of Israel, surrounding the city of Shechem (modern-day Nablus).

According to first-century historian Josephus, Herod the Great renamed the city Sebastia in honor of the Roman emperor Augustus. The Greek sebastos, "venerable", is a translation of the Latin epithet augustus. The modern village name preserves the Roman-period name of Sebaste.

History and archaeology

Ancient Samaria

In the 9th and the 8th centuries BCE, Samaria was capital of the northern Kingdom of Israel. According to the Hebrew Bible, Omri, the sixth king of Israel (ruled 880s–870s BCE), purchased a hill owned by an individual (or clan) named Shemer for two talents of silver, and built its new capital on its broad summit, replacing Israel's Tirzah, Israel's second capital.

According to some biblical scholars, the earliest reference to a settlement at this location may be the town of Shamir, which according to the Hebrew Bible was the home of the judge Tola in the 12th century BC.

Omri is thought to have granted the Arameans the right to "make streets in Samaria" as a sign of submission. This probably meant permission was granted to the Aramean merchants to carry on their trade in the city. This would imply the existence of a considerable Aramean population, who called it Shamerain.

In 720 BCE, Samaria fell to the Neo-Assyrian Empire following a three-year siege, bringing an end to the Kingdom of Israel. After the fall of the Kingdom of Israel, Samaria became an administrative center under Neo-Assyrian, Neo-Babylonian, and Achaemenid rule.

Many important archeological findings were discovered at Ancient Samaria. These included a royal Israelite palace dating from the ninth and eighth centuries BCE. 500 pieces of carved ivory were found in the Samaria, and were identified by some scholars with the "palace adorned with ivory" mentioned in the Bible. The Samaria Ostraca, a collection of 102 ostraca written in the Paleo-Hebrew alphabet were unearthed by George Andrew Reisner of the Harvard Museum of the Ancient Near East.Noegel, p.396

 Classical antiquity 

Samaria was destroyed by Alexander the Great in 331 BCE, and was destroyed again by Hasmonean king John Hyrcanus in 108 BCE. Pompey rebuilt the town in the year 63 BCE. Hellenized Samaritans and the descendants of Macedonian soldiers are believed to had inhabited the city.

In 27 BCE, Samaria was rebuilt by Herod the Great, king of Judea. The new city was renamed "Sebastia" in the honor of the Roman emperor Augustus. Herod built two temples in the city: one, dedicated to Augustus, was constructed on an elevated platform in the city's acropolis; it was probably influenced by the Forum of Caesar in Rome. The second temple was dedicated to Kore. A large stadium was also built at the city, which was settled with 6000 veteran colonists, probably non-Jews who fought alongside Herod and helped him secure the throne. Later, in 7 BCE, with Augustus' approval and after a trial at Berytus, Herod had his sons Alexander and Aristobulus IV transported to Sebastia and executed by being strangled for treason.

Medieval period
Sherds from the Late Roman, Byzantine,Dauphin, 1998, pp. 766–7 early Muslim and Medieval eras have been found in modern-day Sebastia.

Sebastia was the seat of a bishop in the Crusader Kingdom of Jerusalem. It is mentioned in the writings of Yaqut al-Hamawi (1179–1229), the Syrian geographer, who situates it as part of the military district of Filastin in the province of Syria, located two days from that city, in the Nablus District. He also writes, "There are here the tombs of Zakariyyah and Yahya, his son, and of many other prophets and holy men."

Ottoman era

Sebastia was incorporated into the Ottoman Empire in 1517 with all of Palestine, and in 1596 it appeared in the tax registers as being in the Nahiya of Jabal Sami, part  of Sanjak Nablus. It had a population of 20 households and 3 bachelors, all Muslim. The villagers paid taxes on wheat, barley, summer crops, olive trees, occasional revenues, goats and/or beehives; a total of 5,500  akçe.

The French explorer Victor Guérin visited the village in 1870 and found it to have less than a thousand inhabitants.

In 1882, the PEF's Survey of Western Palestine described Sebastia as "A large and flourishing village, of stone and mud houses, on the hill of the ancient Samaria. The position is a very fine one; the hill rises some 400 to 500 feet above the open valley on the north, and is isolated on all sides but the east, where a narrow saddle exists some 200 feet lower than the top of the hill. There is a flat plateau on the top, on the east end of which the village stands, the plateau extending westwards for over half a mile. A higher knoll rises from the plateau, west of the village, from which a fine view is obtained as far as the Mediterranean Sea. The whole hill consists of soft soil, and is terraced to the very top. On the north it is bare and white, with steep slopes, and a few olives; a sort of recess exists on this side, which is all plough-land, in which stand the lower columns. On the south a beautiful olive-grove, rising in terrace above terrace, completely covers the sides of the hill, and a small extent of open terraced-land, for growing barley, exists towards the west and at the top. The village itself is ill-built, and modern, with ruins of a Crusading church of Neby Yahyah (St. John the Baptist), towards the northwest.

A sarcophagus lies by the road on the north-east, but no rock-cut tombs have as yet been noticed on the hill, though possibly hidden beneath the present plough-land. There is a large cemetery of rock-cut tombs to the north, on the other side of the valley. The neighbourhood of Samaria is well supplied with water. In the months of July and August a stream was found (in 1872) in the valley south of the hill, coming from the spring (Ain Harun), which has a good supply of drinkable water, and a conduit leading from it to a small ruined mill. Vegetable gardens exist below the spring. To the east is a second spring called 'Ain Kefr Ruma, and the valley here also flows with water during part of the year, other springs existing further up it. The threshing-floors of the village are on the plateau north-west of the houses. The inhabitants are somewhat turbulent in character, and appear to be rich, possessing very good lands. There is a Greek Bishop, who is, however, non-resident; the majority of the inhabitants are Moslems, but some are Greek Christians."

Between 1915 and 1938, Sebastia was served by two stations on the Afula–Nablus–Tulkarm branch line of the Jezreel Valley railway: Mas'udiya station at the three-way junction, around 1.5 km to the west of the village, and Sabastiya station, around 1.5 km to the south.

The site was first excavated by the Harvard Expedition, initially directed by Gottlieb Schumacher in 1908 and then by George Andrew Reisner in 1909 and 1910; with the assistance of architect C.S. Fisher and D.G. Lyon.

British Mandate era

In the 1922 census of Palestine, conducted by the British Mandate authorities, Sabastia'' had a population of 572; 10 Christians and 562 Muslim. This had increased in the 1931 census to 753; 2 Jews, 20 Christians and 731 Muslim, in a total of 191 houses.

In the 1945 statistics Sebastia had a population of 1,020; 980 Muslims and 40 Christians, with 5,066 dunams of land, according to an official land and population survey. Of this, 1,284 dunams were plantations and irrigable land, 3,493 used for cereals, while 90 dunams were built-up land.

The second expedition was known as the Joint Expedition, a consortium of 5 institutions directed by John Winter Crowfoot between 1931 and 1935; with the assistance of Kathleen Mary Kenyon, Eliezer Sukenik and G.M. Crowfoot. The leading institutions were the British School of Archaeology in Jerusalem, the Palestine Exploration Fund, and the Hebrew University. In the 1960s small scale excavations directed by Fawzi Zayadine were carried out on behalf of the Department of Antiquities of Jordan.

Jordanian era
In the wake of the 1948 Arab–Israeli War, and after the 1949 Armistice Agreements, Sebastia came under  Jordanian rule. In 1961, the population was 1,345.

Post-1967

Since the Six-Day War in 1967, Sebastia has been held under Israeli military occupation, while the Palestinian Authority is the civil authority of the area.

In modern-day Sebastia, the village's main mosque, known as the Nabi Yahya Mosque, stands within the remains of a Crusader cathedral that is believed to be built upon the tombs of the prophets Elisha, Obediah and John the Baptist beside the public square.  There are also Roman royal tombs, and a few medieval and many Ottoman era buildings which survive in a good state of preservation. Jordanian archaeologists had also restored the Roman theater near the town.

In late 1976, the Israeli settlers movement, Gush Emunim, attempted to establish a settlement at the Ottoman train station. The Israeli government did not approve and the group that was removed from the site would later found the settlement of Elon Moreh adjacent to Nablus.

Today, Sebastia is a Palestinian village of over 4,500 inhabitants, located in the Nablus Governorate of the Palestinian Authority. The ancient site of Sebastia is located just above the built-up area of the modern day village on the eastern slope of the hill.

Ecclesiastical see
The Archdiocese of Sebastia is part of the Greek Orthodox Patriarchate of Jerusalem. Theodosios (Hanna) has been the see's archbishop since 2005.

See also
Cities of the ancient Near East
Short chronology timeline
List of modern names for biblical place names

References

Bibliography

Further reading
Tappy, R. E. (1992). The Archaeology of Israelite Samaria: Vol. I, Early Iron Age through the Ninth Century BCE. Harvard Semitic Studies 44. Atlanta, GA: Scholars Press.
Tappy, R. E. (2001). The Archaeology of Israelite Samaria: Vol. II, The Eighth Century BCE. Harvard Semitic Studies 50. Winona Lake, IN: Eisenbrauns.

External links
Welcome To Sabastiya
Sebastiya, Welcome to Palestine
Survey of Western Palestine, Map 11:   IAA, Wikimedia commons
Sabastiya, aerial photo, Applied Research Institute–Jerusalem ARIJ
 Development Priorities and Needs in Sabastiya,  ARIJ
Municipality of Sabastiya - Nablus Governorate - Palestine 
Throne villages, with Al Kayed Palace in Sabastiya, RIWAQ

Samaria (city), biblewalks

Bronze Age sites in the State of Palestine
Villages in the West Bank
Throne villages
Municipalities of the State of Palestine
Ruins in the State of Palestine
Populated places established in the 9th century BC
Kingdom of Israel (Samaria)
Omrides